Putlur is a neighbourhood in Chennai, India. It is a village and suburb in Tiruvallur city of Tamil Nadu, located on the western outskirts of the city.

Landmarks
The suburb is famous for the temple dedicated to Goddess Angala Parameswari (Goddess Parvathy, Goddess Poongavanathu Amman). According to the legend, the presiding deity is made of sand, which appears like a pregnant woman lying on the ground.

Transportation
Puttlur is served by Putlur railway station in the West line of the Chennai Suburban Railway Network.

References

External links
 Sri Angala Parameswari temple in Dinamalar Temples

Villages in Tiruvallur district